Sloansville is a hamlet in Schoharie County, New York, United States. Sloansville has a post office with ZIP code 12160, which opened on March 13, 1818.

References

Hamlets in Schoharie County, New York
Hamlets in New York (state)